Mirza Hasanović (born 16 September 1990) is a Bosnian-Herzegovinian footballer who plays for German amateur-side VfB Straubing.

References

External links
 

1990 births
Living people
People from Zvornik
Association football midfielders
Bosnia and Herzegovina footballers
FK Sloboda Tuzla players
CS Turnu Severin players
FC Dinamo București players
FK Radnički Lukavac players
First League of the Federation of Bosnia and Herzegovina players
Liga I players
Landesliga players
Bosnia and Herzegovina expatriate footballers
Expatriate footballers in Romania
Bosnia and Herzegovina expatriate sportspeople in Romania
Expatriate footballers in Sweden
Bosnia and Herzegovina expatriate sportspeople in Sweden
Expatriate footballers in Germany
Bosnia and Herzegovina expatriate sportspeople in Germany